We Are Many is a documentary film about the February 2003 global day of protest against the Iraq War, directed by Amir Amirani. Social movement researchers have described the 15 February protest as "the largest protest event in human history." Tony Blair's ally Lord Falconer says the anti-war march did change things:

"If a million people come out on the streets in the future, then what government is going to say they are wrong now?"

The film's title is an allusion to a line in Percy Bysshe Shelley's poem "The Masque of Anarchy".
The film features activists, politicians and celebrities who participated in the march, such as Medea Benjamin from Code Pink, Phyllis Bennis from Institute for Policy Studies, Tony Benn, Lindsey German, Reverend Jesse Jackson, Danny Glover, Damon Albarn, Brian Eno, among others.

After a successful launch in the U.K. and Europe, the film is releasing in North America and globally, under COVID-19 pandemic, in virtual cinemas. The release date is September 21, 2020, International Day of Peace, in an event titled "100 Cities. One Night for Peace." Many of the communities and local organizers from the 2003 protest will partake in this special event.

See also
The Ground Truth, a 2006 documentary film about veterans of the Iraq War.
Why We Fight, a 2005 documentary film about the military–industrial complex, and its rise particularly prior to the 2003 Invasion of Iraq.
15 February 2003, anti-war protests
Protests against the Iraq War

References

External links

Documentary films about the Iraq War
2014 films
2014 documentary films
Opposition to the Iraq War
2003 in politics
British documentary films
2010s English-language films
2010s British films